Douglas Keely Kevan FRSE FACCA (1895–1968) was a 20th-century British chartered accountant and noted entomologist and conchologist.

Life

He was born on 4 February 1895 in Chelmsford in Essex, the son of Alfred Keely Kevan.

He served in the Territorial Army and at the onset of the First World War was immediately called up. He served in the London Scottish Regiment. He was promoted to Second Lieutenant in May 1915. He was wounded later in 1915 and transferred to home duties with the Royal Army Service Corps, where he achieved the rank of captain.

In his professional life he worked variously for Neame & Co and for Price & Price, largely linked to the timber industry. In 1943 he was elected a Fellow of the Royal Society of Edinburgh due to his contributions to science. His proposers were Alexander Charles Stephen, James Ritchie, James Wright and Thomas Rowatt.

He retired in 1958 and died at home, 9 Cluny Drive in Edinburgh on 15 May 1968.

Family

In 1918 he married Gynnyth Paine. Their children included Prof Douglas Keith McEwan Kevan FRSE.

References

1895 births
1968 deaths
London Scottish soldiers
Fellows of the Royal Society of Edinburgh
British entomologists
20th-century British zoologists
British Army personnel of World War I
London Scottish officers
Royal Army Service Corps officers
Military personnel from Chelmsford